The International 10 Rater (10R) is a class of radio controlled sailing yacht used for competitive racing. It is a measurement controlled classes administered by the International Radio Sailing Association. The class is a designated IRSA International class entitled to hold World Championships officially recognised by the World Sailing. A 10 rater is the longest and tallest of all the international classes and has rules that allow the most scope for development.

Events

World Championships

Unofficial World Championships
Unclear of the status of these events as the International Radio Sailing Association only joined ISAF in the mid 1990s.

References

External links
  International Radio Sailing Association Website
  ISAF 10 Rater Microsite Website

Classes of the International Radio Sailing Association
Keelboats
Development sailing classes